Sandhøhallet Glacier is a small glacier flowing southeast from the southern slopes of Sandhø Heights in the Conrad Mountains of Queen Maud Land. It was mapped by Norway from air photos and surveys by the Norwegian Antarctic Expedition of 1956–60, and named Sandhøhallet ("the sand heights slope").

See also
 List of glaciers in the Antarctic
 Glaciology

References

Glaciers of Queen Maud Land
Princess Astrid Coast